The 5th Royal Bavarian Division was a unit of the Royal Bavarian Army which served alongside the Prussian Army as part of the Imperial German Army. The division was formed on October 1, 1890, in Landau as the 5th Division and swapped division numbers with the Nuremberg-based 3rd Royal Bavarian Division in 1901. In Bavarian sources, it was not generally referred to as a "Royal Bavarian" division, as this was considered self-evident, but outside Bavaria, this designation was used for it, and other Bavarian units, to distinguish them from similarly numbered Prussian units. The division was part of the III Royal Bavarian Army Corps.

Combat chronicle

During World War I, the division served on the Western Front. It fought initially in the Battle of the Frontiers. It then served in the area between the Meuse and Moselle Rivers until October 1915, seeing action on the Meuse heights by St. Mihiel and in the Bois-brulé, and then fought in the Second Battle of Champagne. After a brief period in reserve, the division went in the trenchlines in the Meuse-Moselle region until September 1916, and then fought briefly in the Battle of the Somme, where it suffered heavy losses. From October 1916 into 1918, the division occupied the trenchlines in Flanders and the Artois, and fought in the Battle of Arras and the Battle of Passchendaele. After a month in reserve, it went into the 1918 German spring offensive, fighting in the First Battle of the Somme (1918), also known as the Second Battle of the Somme (to distinguish it from the 1916 battle). It then remained on the defensive in the region until the end of the war, including fighting in the Second Battle of the Somme (1918), also known as the Third Battle of the Somme. Allied intelligence rated the division as first class, although not one of the best Bavarian divisions.

Pre–World War I peacetime organization

In 1914, the peacetime organization of the 5th Royal Bavarian Division was as follows:

9. bayerische Infanterie-Brigade
Kgl. Bayerisches 14. Infanterie-Regiment Hartmann
Kgl. Bayerisches 21. Infanterie-Regiment Großherzog Friedrich Franz IV. von Mecklenburg-Schwerin
10. bayerische Infanterie-Brigade
Kgl. Bayerisches 7. Infanterie-Regiment Prinz Leopold 
Kgl. Bayerisches 19. Infanterie-Regiment König Viktor Emanuel III. von Italien
5. bayerische Kavallerie-Brigade
Kgl. Bayerisches 1. Chevaulegers-Regiment Kaiser Nikolaus von Rußland
Kgl. Bayerisches 6. Chevaulegers-Regiment Prinz Albrecht von Preußen
5. bayerische Feldartillerie-Brigade
Kgl. Bayerisches 6. Feldartillerie-Regiment Prinz Ferdinand von Bourbon, Herzog von Calabrien
Kgl. Bayerisches 10. Feldartillerie-Regiment
Landwehr-Inspektion Nürnberg

Order of battle on mobilization

On mobilization, in August 1914, at the beginning of World War I, most divisional cavalry, including brigade headquarters, was withdrawn to form cavalry divisions or split up among divisions as reconnaissance units. Divisions received engineer companies and other support units from their higher headquarters. The 5th Bavarian Division was renamed the 5th Bavarian Infantry Division. The division's initial wartime organization (major units) was as follows:

9. bayerische Infanterie-Brigade
Kgl. Bayerisches 14. Infanterie-Regiment Hartmann
Kgl. Bayerisches 21. Infanterie-Regiment Großherzog Friedrich Franz IV. von Mecklenburg-Schwerin
Kgl. Bayerisches Reserve-Jäger-Bataillon Nr. 2
10. bayerische Infanterie-Brigade
Kgl. Bayerisches 7. Infanterie-Regiment Prinz Leopold 
Kgl. Bayerisches 19. Infanterie-Regiment König Viktor Emanuel III. von Italien
Kgl. Bayerisches 7. Chevaulegers-Regiment Prinz Alfons 
5. bayerische Feldartillerie-Brigade
Kgl. Bayerisches 6. Feldartillerie-Regiment Prinz Ferdinand von Bourbon, Herzog von Calabrien
Kgl. Bayerisches 10. Feldartillerie-Regiment
1.Kompanie/Kgl. Bayerisches 3. Pionier-Bataillon
3.Kompanie/Kgl. Bayerisches 3. Pionier-Bataillon

Late World War I organization

Divisions underwent many changes during the war, with regiments moving from division to division, and some being destroyed and rebuilt. During the war, most divisions became triangular - one infantry brigade with three infantry regiments rather than two infantry brigades of two regiments (a "square division"). The 5th Bavarian Infantry Division was triangularized in January 1917, sending the 9th Bavarian Infantry Brigade headquarters and the 14th Bavarian Infantry Regiment to the newly formed 16th Bavarian Infantry Division. An artillery commander replaced the artillery brigade headquarters, the cavalry was further reduced, and the engineer contingent was increased. Divisional signals commanders were established to better control communications, a major problem in coordinating infantry and artillery operations during World War I. The division's order of battle on March 20, 1918, was as follows:

10. bayerische Infanterie-Brigade
Kgl. Bayerisches 7. Infanterie-Regiment Prinz Leopold 
Kgl. Bayerisches 19. Infanterie-Regiment König Viktor Emanuel III. von Italien 
Kgl. Bayerisches 21. Infanterie-Regiment Großherzog Friedrich Franz IV. von Mecklenburg-Schwerin
Kgl. Bayerische Maschinengewehr-Scharfschützen-Abteilung Nr. 1
4.Eskadron/Kgl. Bayerisches 2. Chevaulegers-Regiment Taxis
Kgl. Bayerischer Artillerie-Kommandeur 5
Kgl. Bayerisches 10. Feldartillerie-Regiment
III.Bataillon/Kgl. Bayerisches 1. Fußartillerie-Regiment vakant Bothmer
Kgl. Bayerisches 3. Pionier-Bataillon
Kgl. Bayerische Pionier-Kompanie Nr. 10
Kgl. Bayerische Pionier-Kompanie Nr. 13
Kgl. Bayerische Minenwerfer-Kompanie Nr. 5
Kgl. Bayerischer Divisions-Nachrichten-Kommandeur 5

References
 5. Bayerische-Infanterie-Division (Chronik 1914/1918) at 1914-18.info
 Claus von Bredow, bearb., Historische Rang- und Stammliste des deutschen Heeres (1905)
 Hermann Cron et al., Ruhmeshalle unserer alten Armee (Berlin, 1935)
 Hermann Cron, Geschichte des deutschen Heeres im Weltkriege 1914-1918 (Berlin, 1937)
 Günter Wegner, Stellenbesetzung der deutschen Heere 1825-1939. (Biblio Verlag, Osnabrück, 1993)
 Histories of Two Hundred and Fifty-One Divisions of the German Army which Participated in the War (1914-1918), compiled from records of Intelligence section of the General Staff, American Expeditionary Forces, at General Headquarters, Chaumont, France 1919, (1920)

Notes

Infantry divisions of Germany in World War I
Military units and formations established in 1890
Military units and formations of Bavaria
1890 establishments in Bavaria
1919 disestablishments in Germany
Military units and formations disestablished in 1919